Jasmin Fazlić (born 16 October 1986), known by his stage name Jala Brat, is a Bosnian rapper and hip-hop recording artist, songwriter and producer. He is best known for collaborating with another Bosnian rapper Buba Corelli.

Jala also represented Bosnia and Herzegovina in the Eurovision Song Contest 2016 by co-writing and performing "Ljubav je" together with Dalal, Deen and Ana Rucner but failed to qualify to the final.

In the summer of 2016, Jala announced he would run as a candidate for the Party of Democratic Action (SDA) in Bosnia's 2016 municipal elections.

Career

Beginning of the career
Jala started making rap music in 2004 at his improvised house-studio. Later, he formed a Hip hop group Bluntbylon with Smayla and several other members. Their career started mostly on YouTube. He also made a few solo-works at that period. In 2011, he released his first EP Replay, on which his first song with Buba Corelli appeared.

2012 works
In 2012 he released his first solo album Riječ na riječ. He also released EP Mahala with Shtela. He also started making album Lice Ulice, but it is still unfinished yet. In 2012 two singles were released, (Lice Ulice and Uzeću vam sve).

In 2015, Dom, the third single from album was released, revealing that the project is not canceled but only paused. Also, in 2012 Jala, alongside Buba Corelli, started releasing singles from EP SA Sin City. There were 5 singles released, and EP was fully completed in 2013.

Pakt s Đavolom alongside Buba Corelli
On 16 November 2014, the first single from the album, "Bez Tebe", was released. Full album was released on 13 December 2014, following three singles (22, Trinidad & Tobago and Borba). The album gained huge success and Jala and Corelli were the most listened rappers in Bosnia and Herzegovina at the time.

Following the success of Pakt s Đavolom, in 2015 both Jala and Buba Corelli started to make their music more commercial and less underground as they used to. In 6 September Jala released a single Casino.Buba Corelli was jailed during that time, and Jala continued to make music without him until the end of Eurovision when Corelli was released.

During Corelli's time in jail, Jala released a single Dom from album Lice Ulice that was dedicated to Corelli and 3 other rappers who were jailed alongside him. Although he wasn't singing turbo-folk himself, he made several works with turbo-folk artists Dado Polumenta (Dominantna), Maya Berović (To me radi, with Buba Corelli as a co-star) and Mile Kitić's daughter, Elena Kitić. On 28 July 2016, Elena released her first official song Folira where Jala was a co-star.

In October 2016, both Jala and Buba Corelli announced that they will publish new album "Kruna". Album contains 8 singles. It was more commercial than their last albums, and most of the songs don't include both Jala and Buba. Only two singles, Klinka and Ne Volim (featuring Elena) were made by both of them. 3 singles, Comfort, Sporije and Dokaz were made by Buba Corelli only, and rest of them, Restart, La Martina and Bakšiš were made by Jala. The album used advanced technology, with 6 out of 8 singles published with 4K videos, and two lyrics videos.

Collaboration with other rappers
Since 2011 Jala was mostly collaborating with Bosnian underground rappers that were mostly popular at that time. Besides Buba Corelli, he was known for his work with his colleagues from Bluntbylon, with Smayla as most popular one. He was also working with Buba Corelli's group G recordz and their members.

He also made several songs with rappers Klijent and Anći and also members of the Sarajevo groups Treća Smjena Crew, Capital City Crew and Dlan Beats. In 2012 he was working with one of the biggest Bosnian rappers, Frenkie, with whom he released music video Ne odustajem for the song of the same name from Riječ na Riječ. He later made several works with Serbian Juice who was also his guest on Pakt s Đavolom. In 2018, he released the promotional single "Mafia" with Buba Corelli.

Discography

Studio albums
Riječ na riječ (2012)
Pakt s Đavolom, with Buba Corelli (2014)
Stari Radio, with Buba Corelli (2016)
Kruna, with Buba Corelli (2016)
Alfa & Omega, with Buba Corelli (2019)
99 (2019)
Futura (2021)

Extended plays
Replay (2011)
Mahala, with Shtela (2012)
Sin City, with Buba Corelli (2013)

Singles

As lead artist

As featured artist

Promotional singles

Other charted and certified songs

References

External links

1986 births
Living people
Singers from Sarajevo
Bosnia and Herzegovina musicians
Bosnia and Herzegovina rappers
Eurovision Song Contest entrants for Bosnia and Herzegovina
Eurovision Song Contest entrants of 2016
Yugoslav people
Bosniaks of Bosnia and Herzegovina